<onlyinclude>

September 2022

See also

References

killings by law enforcement officers
 09